Alicia C. Shepard (born April 27, 1953, in Boston, Massachusetts)  is an American  journalist, media writer and expert on the work and lives of Bob Woodward and Carl Bernstein.  In February 2014, she moved to Kabul, Afghanistan to work with Afghan journalists. In fall 2012 Shepard joined the University of Nevada, Las Vegas faculty as a guest professor for the  Greenspun College of Urban Affairs. She joined National Public Radio (NPR) in October, 2007, for a three-year appointment as the Ombudsman for the nonprofit public media organization that ended May 31, 2011. In that role, she said on June 21, 2009, that waterboarding, as practiced by Americans on terror captives, should not be called 'torture', although she later mentioned in an interview that "I think that it does... constitute torture."    On this matter she claimed she was supporting an NPR policy originated by Managing Editor David Sweeney.

Shepard taught media ethics at Georgetown University to its masters program from 2007 until 2010. She also taught journalism at American University. She was a Times Mirror Visiting Professor at University of Texas at Austin for the 2005-2006 academic year, where she taught a class she designed on Watergate and the press.  She spent the last four years interviewing more than 175 people connected to Bob Woodward and Carl Bernstein and sifting through the new archival materials that UT bought from Woodward and Bernstein for $5 million in 2003. She is the author of the 2006 book "Woodward and Bernstein: Life in the Shadow of Watergate."

Awards and recognition

Shepard contributes to Washingtonian and People magazines, and has written for The New York Times, The Washington Post and the Chicago Tribune.  For nearly a decade, she wrote for American Journalism Review on such things as ethics, the newspaper industry and how journalism works - or doesn't.  For that work, the National Press Club awarded her its top media criticism prize three different years.  In 2003, she was a Foster Distinguished Writer at Penn State.  From 1982 to 1987, she was a reporter for the San Jose Mercury News in California.

Personal

Shepard has traveled extensively in the U.S. and abroad.  In 2002, she bicycled 517 miles from Amsterdam to Paris.  In 1987, Shepard, her husband, the photojournalist Robert Hodierne, and one-year-old son, Cutter Hodierne, set sail on their 32-foot sailboat, “Yankee Lady”, for the South Pacific.  They spent three years cruising in the islands, and she wrote about their adventures.  They sailed to Japan and stayed for two more years writing, editing, teaching English and learning Japanese. The couple since divorced. Their son, Cutter Hodierne, is director of the 2012 Sundance Grand Jury prize for the short film, "Fishing Without Nets," about the Somali pirates from their point of view.

Shepard graduated from George Washington University, with honors in English, and received a masters in journalism from the University of Maryland in 2002.

She lives in Arlington, Virginia.

Torture Controversy 
In June 2009, Shepard, acting in the capacity of NPR Ombudsman, deflected objections to NPR's use of euphemisms such as "enhanced interrogations" as a replacement for the word "torture" in their reporting about waterboarding, stating: "No matter how many distinguished groups — the International Red Cross, the U.N. High Commissioners — say waterboarding is torture, there are responsible people who say it is not. Former President Bush, former Vice President Cheney, their staff and their supporters obviously believed that waterboarding terrorism suspects was necessary to protect the nation's security. One can disagree strongly with those beliefs and their actions. But they are due some respect for their views, which are shared by a portion of the American public. So, it is not an open-and-shut case that everyone believes waterboarding to be torture."

Shepard herself stated that she personally believed waterboarding was torture in an interview with Bob Garfield of On the Media.

Bibliography

Books and articles 

 Woodward & Bernstein: Life in the Shadow of Watergate - about the personal and professional lives of Bob Woodward and Carl Bernstein during and post-Watergate; (2006)  
 Running Toward Danger: Stories Behind the Breaking News of 9/11  (co-author) - about how journalists covered 9/11 and the role they played as modern-day keepers of calm on America's most terrifying day. (2002) 
 Narrowing the Gap: Military , Media and the Iraq War - Conference Report for the McCormick Tribune Foundation, 2004
 Washingtonian article written by Shepard on Woodward & Bernstein 
 Los Angeles Times article written by Shepard regarding Woodward & Bernstein
 Alicia C. Shepard: A belated scoop
 A's for Everyone! (The Washington Post article about grade inflation)
 Thinking Clearly (Shepard wrote a chapter in this book on the Columbine Shootings)
 Uncivil War - article written for the American Journalism Review
 Preparing for Disaster - article written for the American Journalism Review
 Appointment in Somalia - article written for the American Journalism Review

References

External links
 Alicia Shepard on Conversations with Allan Wolper

1953 births
American University faculty and staff
Living people
Ombudsmen